Tommy Thompson (born April 27, 1972) is a former professional American football player who played punter for three seasons for the San Francisco 49ers.
He is married to Nicole Thompson.
He has two daughters, Rylee and Ryenn Thompson

References

1972 births
Living people
American football punters
San Francisco 49ers players
Sportspeople from Santa Barbara County, California
Oregon Ducks football players
People from Lompoc, California
Players of American football from California